Bonfim is a Portuguese parish, located in the municipality of Porto. The population in 2011 was 24,265, in an area of 3.10 km².

References

Parishes of Porto